Apachita (Aymara for the place of transit of an important pass in the principal routes of the Andes; name for a stone cairn in the Andes, a little pile of rocks built along the trail in the high mountains, Hispanicized spelling Apacheta)  is a mountain in the Andes of Bolivia, about  high. It is situated in the La Paz Department, José Manuel Pando Province, Catacora Municipality. Apachita lies south of the mountain Wila Qullu, north-west of Ch'iyar Jaqhi and south-east of Laram Q'awa and Chuqiwa Qullu (Chuquivakkollu).

References 

Mountains of La Paz Department (Bolivia)